Frank Kegelbein is a German lightweight boxer who won the bronze medal of world championships in Rom, 1978. He competed for the SC Dynamo Berlin / Sportvereinigung (SV) Dynamo.

References 

Lightweight boxers
Living people
German male boxers
Year of birth missing (living people)